Santpoort-Noord or North Santpoort is a village in the municipality of Velsen in the Dutch province of North Holland. It lies about 6 km (3.7 mi) north of Haarlem.

Santpoort developed in the dunes near the Brederode Castle. In 1870, a flower bulb settlement developed near Santpoort. In 1926, the settlement was divided in Santpoort-Noord and Santpoort-Zuid. Santpoort became a commuter's town in the 20th century.

Railway station
In 1957, Santpoort Noord railway station opened on the Haarlem to Uitgeest railway line. Between 1953 and 1983, there was also a railway line to IJmuiden.

References

External links
 

Populated places in North Holland
Velsen